Ahmed Yousef Al-Zain (born 2 July 1991) is a Saudi professional footballer who currently plays as a winger for Pro League club Al-Khaleej on loan from Damac.

Club career
He started out his footballing career at Al-Ittihad where he spent his youth years before joining Abha in the summer of 2013. Al-Zain spent two successful seasons at Abha before joining Pro League Al-Taawoun in 2015. Al-Zain returned to Jeddah, joining Al-Ahli in the summer of 2017 after two successful seasons with Al-Taawoun. On 29 January 2018, Al-Zain joined Al-Fayha on loan until the end of the 2017–18 season. On 22 July 2018, Al-Zain joined Al-Qadsiah on loan until the end of the 2018–19 season. On 28 July 2019, Al-Zain joined Al-Raed on a three-year deal. On 27 February 2022, Al-Zain signed a pre-contract deal with Damac. He joined the club following the expiration of his contract with Al-Raed on 30 June 2022. On 27 January 2023, Al-Zain joined Al-Khaleej on loan.

References

 

1991 births
Living people
Sportspeople from Jeddah
Saudi Arabian footballers
Ittihad FC players
Abha Club players
Al-Taawoun FC players
Al-Ahli Saudi FC players
Al-Fayha FC players
Al-Qadsiah FC players
Al-Raed FC players
Damac FC players
Khaleej FC players
Saudi First Division League players
Saudi Professional League players
Association football wingers